Tardienta is a municipality located in Huesca Province, Aragon, Spain. According to the 2004 census (INE), the municipality has a population of 1,072 inhabitants.

It is located on the Madrid–Huesca high-speed rail line.

References

Municipalities in the Province of Huesca